Cocoa Junior High School is a historic school building in Cocoa, Florida (Brevard County). Built in 1923-24, it is one of the oldest remaining Rosenwald Schools in Florida. After the school closed in 1954, the building served as a community center and later as an African-American history museum.

History
Cocoa Junior High School was built between 1922 and 1924. Part of the funding for the school came from the Julius Rosenwald Fund and it served African American students. In 1938, teachers Harry T. Moore and John E. Gilbert sued the school district in order to receive equal pay for black teachers. Gilbert v. Board of Public Instruction of Brevard County reached the Florida Supreme Court, where the court ruled in favor of the district.

It became Monroe High School in 1947 when it began to serve grades 10-12. Following the 1954 Brown v. Board of Education decision which desegregated American public schools, the school was closed and pupils were sent to integrate local public schools. 

The building was acquired by the City of Cocoa and turned into a community center. Renamed the Harry T. Moore Center, it was named for Harry T. Moore, a local civil rights advocate. Moore and his wife had been assassinated three years earlier on Christmas Day 1951 and are believed to be the first civil rights activists to be assassinated during the movement.

In 2014 the building was renovated for use as an African American history museum. It is currently a site on Florida's Black Heritage Trail.

In 2019 Cocoa Junior High School was added to the National Register of Historic Places.

References

Rosenwald schools
Buildings and structures completed in 1922
Buildings and structures in Brevard County, Florida
African-American historic places
National Register of Historic Places in Brevard County, Florida